Airolo-Quinto is the name of a planned municipality in Ticino, Switzerland. 

The new municipality would be formed from the existing municipalities of Airolo and Quinto. A merger date has not yet been determined.

References 

Municipalities of Ticino